Daar doer in die bosveld ( Far Away in the Bushveld) is the first film by the South African director Jamie Uys. It was originally released in 1951. The film is in the Afrikaans language, a language specific to Southern Africa.

Plot
The film is a comedy about a shy farmer named Hans Botha who is asked to pick up a young school teacher named Martie du Toit. When Hans arrives at the bus stop to pick up Martie he is completely dumbstruck by her beauty and only able to say the phrases, "It looks like rain." and "It was an accident." The two experience many difficulties along the way; mostly due to Hans' ancient car. When the pair arrive at Martie's destination, Martie is soaking wet and convinced that Hans is an idiot. Hans, however, is utterly in love with Martie.

Cast

Crew

References

1951 films
Films directed by Jamie Uys
Afrikaans-language films
1951 comedy films
1951 directorial debut films
South African comedy films